Arrowsmith Island is a mostly ice-covered island in the Pitt group of Biscoe Islands, Antarctica.  It is 2.53 km long in west-southwest to east-northeast direction and 900 m wide.

The island is named after the British cartographer Aaron Arrowsmith (1750-1823) who published a map of the south polar region in 1794.

Location

British mapping in 1971.

Maps
 British Antarctic Territory: Graham Coast.  Scale 1:200000 topographic map.  DOS 610 Series, Sheet W 65 64.  Directorate of Overseas Surveys, UK, 1971.
 Antarctic Digital Database (ADD). Scale 1:250000 topographic map of Antarctica. Scientific Committee on Antarctic Research (SCAR). Since 1993, regularly upgraded and updated.

References

 Bulgarian Antarctic Gazetteer. Antarctic Place-names Commission. (details in Bulgarian, basic data in English)
 Arrowsmith Island. SCAR Composite Antarctic Gazetteer.

External links
 Arrowsmith Island. Copernix satellite image

Islands of the Biscoe Islands
Bulgaria and the Antarctic